Zak Andy Ansah (born 4 May 1994) is an English-born Ghanaian semi professional footballer who plays for Faversham Town.

Club career

Arsenal
Ansah, the son of former Southend United player Andy Ansah, had spells with Sydenham Sports club and Charlton Athletic before joining the academy at Arsenal at the age of 10, who beat off interest from several other London-based clubs including Tottenham Hotspur and AFC Wimbledon. Ansah made his way through the club's youth system, making his debut for their under-18 side at the age of just 14 and later impressing in the NextGen Series youth competition.

On 4 December 2012, with Arsenal already qualified for the next round of the competition, Ansah was named as a substitute for the club's Champions League group stage match against Olympiacos but remained on the bench during a 2–1 defeat. He suffered a tear of his ACL in July 2013 that ruled him out for eight months, the second time he had suffered the injury, but returned to the development squad in March 2014, scoring in a 5–3 win over West Ham United. At the end of the 2013–14 season, Ansah was released by Arsenal without making a first-team appearance.

Charlton Athletic
Ansah subsequently joined Football League Championship side Charlton Athletic on a two-year deal, working with under-21 development manager Jason Euell. In March 2015, he joined Football League Two side Plymouth Argyle until the end of the 2014–15 season, scoring on his debut for the club, the third goal in a 3–0 win over Cheltenham Town. He then scored Plymouth Argyle's first goal of their League 2 Play-off tie with Wycombe Wanderers at Home Park, his goal making the scoreline 3–1 in Wycombe's favour at the time. He made a total of 10 appearances for the club, scoring twice.

In August 2015, Ansah returned to League Two, joining Newport County on an initial one-month loan deal, making his debut in a 3–2 defeat to Leyton Orient. At the end of that loan period he returned to Charlton before rejoining Newport County for a second loan on 9 October 2015. On 24 October 2015 he scored his first two goals for Newport in a 4–1 win over Bristol Rovers. He returned to Charlton when his loan ended on 12 December 2015.

Woking
On 3 August 2016, Ansah joined Surrey-based side Woking for the 2016–17 National League season. Three days later, Ansah made his Woking debut in a 3–1 home defeat against Lincoln City, playing the full 90 minutes. On 9 August 2016, Ansah scored his first Woking goal in a 2–2 draw with Solihull Moors, netting Woking's second. After suffering a long-term knee injury in October 2016, Ansah was forced out of the Woking team until March 2017. Returning in the Cards' 2–1 defeat against North Ferriby United, replacing Ismail Yakubu in the 73rd minute.

On 23 May 2017, it was announced that Ansah would leave Woking upon the expiry of his current deal in June 2017.

Hythe Town
Following his release from Woking, Ansah had a spell in Sunday league football, before joining Isthmian League Division One South side, Hythe Town. He went onto score twice on his Hythe debut during their league tie against East Grinstead Town, which resulted in a 3–2 victory. By March 2018, Ansah registered his tenth and eleventh goals of the season in the space of three months, inspiring a two-goal comeback against Whyteleafe. Following the conclusion of the 2017–18 campaign, Ansah registered his tally to 20 goals, after netting thirteen times in ten consecutive games.

On 6 June 2018, Ansah agreed a new one-year deal with Hythe.

Herne Bay
Despite interest from Football League and National League sides, Ansah opted to join fellow Isthmian League side, Herne Bay.

Faversham Town
On 17 November 2022, Ansah signed for Isthmian League South East side Faversham Town.

International career

Ansah has represented England at both Under-16 and Under-17 level. In 2012, at the age of 18, Ansah was called up to the Ghana under-20 side for the first time but both Ansah and his father Andy blasted the Ghana Football Association stating that they had not been notified of the call-up and had discovered it after a family friend had messaged to congratulate him. Ansah later committed his international future to Ghana and, the following year, he was called up to the provisional under-20 training squad to train with a view to being included in the squad for the 2013 FIFA U-20 World Cup but was later omitted from the final squad.

Career statistics

References

External links

1994 births
Living people
Footballers from Sidcup
Arsenal F.C. players
Charlton Athletic F.C. players
Plymouth Argyle F.C. players
Newport County A.F.C. players
Woking F.C. players
Hythe Town F.C. players
Herne Bay F.C. players
Faversham Town F.C. players
English Football League players
National League (English football) players
Isthmian League players
Ghanaian footballers
Association football forwards